is a passenger railway station located in the city of Miki, Hyōgo Prefecture, Japan, operated by the private Kobe Electric Railway (Shintetsu).

Lines

Station layout
The station consists of a ground-level side platform serving a single bi-directional track. The station is unattended.

Adjacent stations

History
It was renamed June 15, 1958.

Passenger statistics
In fiscal 2019, the station was used by an average of 1545 passengers daily.

Surrounding area
 Kansai University of International Studies
 Hyogo Prefectural Miki Kita High School
 Miki City Midorigaoka Sports Park

See also
List of railway stations in Japan

References

External links

 Official website (Kobe Electric Railway) 

Railway stations in Japan opened in 1950
Railway stations in Hyōgo Prefecture
Miki, Hyōgo